John Desmond Hutchinson was Archdeacon of Cloyne from 1965 until 1967; and then of Cork from 1972 until 1986.

He was educated at Trinity College, Dublin and ordained in 1946. After a curacy in Maryborough he was a chaplain to the Mission to Seamen. He held incumbencies at Rathcormac, Clonmel, Kerricurrihy, Blackrock and Moviddy.

References

1917 births
Alumni of Trinity College Dublin
Archdeacons of Cloyne
Year of death missing